A referendum on allowing the election of independents was held in Ecuador on 2 June 1986 alongside provincial elections. The proposal was rejected by 69% of voters.

The same question was later asked in a 1994 referendum, with voters voting in favour.

Results

References

Referendums in Ecuador
1986 in Ecuador
1986 referendums
Electoral reform referendums
Electoral reform in Ecuador